Ellen Dorrit Petersen (born 4 December 1975) is a Norwegian actress.

Life and career
Petersen was born in the small town of Tau but moved to Oslo for her professional studies. She attended the Oslo National Academy of the Arts. She was active within Rogaland Teater between 2005 and 2006, then went on to work at Det Norske Teatret. Petersen debuted as a screen actress in 2008 with the drama film Troubled Water. She has played leading roles in such productions as the 2014 film Blind, ITV's Aber Bergen, and the Netflix series Borderliner.
The actress has been nominated for several awards throughout her career and has won two Amanda, one Kanon, and one Gullruten award.

Petersen is married to composer Ola Fløttum. The couple have two children together, a son and a daughter.

Selected filmography

Awards and recognition
 Amanda Award for Best Actress in Iskyss (2009)
 Nominated for Amanda Award, Best Actress in Fjellet (2011)
 Kanon Award for Best Actress in Blind (2014)
 Amanda Award for Best Actress in Blind (2014)
 Gullruten for Best Actress in Aber Bergen (2017)
 Nominated for Gullruten, Best Actress in Aber Bergen (2018)

References

External links
 
 Ellen Dorrit Petersen at Panorama talent agency

1975 births
Living people
People from Strand, Norway
Norwegian actresses